The 1858 Oregon gubernatorial election took place on June 7, 1858 to elect the first governor in anticipation of Oregon statehood. With the state Democratic Party split into factions driven by personal rivalry and state government influence, the election matched insurgent E. M. Barnum against establishment candidate John Whiteaker, who won. The Republican Party first nominated John Denny, but he later withdrew in favor of the insurgent Democrat, whom the party hoped to win over to the Republicans.

Results

References

Gubernatorial
1858
Oregon
June 1858 events